Darius Paul Dassault ( Bloch; 13 January 1882 – 3 May 1969) was a French general who was in the French Résistance in World War II.

He was born in Paris. His alias Dassault developed when he was in the French Résistance. The name alludes to the code name "Chardasso" and is derived from "char d'assaut", the French term for "tank". He was the elder brother of Marcel Bloch (later Marcel Dassault), the aviation engineer.

Career

 20 March 1933 : Rank of brigade general (général de brigade)
 23 March 1936 : Rank of division general (général de division)
 19 December 1938 : Rank of corps general (général de corps d’armée)
 1940 : Commander of Anti-Aircraft Artillery
 1941–1944 : Resistant under the name Rapp, then Chardasso
 1944 : First Free French Military Governor of Paris.
 31 December 1947 : Rank of army general (général d'armée)

Honours
 Grand Cross of the Légion d’honneur (29 June 1946; Grand Officer: 17 May 1945; Commander: 27 December 1934; Officer: 4 February 1921; Knight: 16 December 1916)
 Médaille militaire – 27 June 1951
 Croix de guerre 1914–1918 with 3 palms and 3 stars
 Croix de guerre 1939–1945
 Médaille de la Résistance
 Allied Victory Medal 1914–1918
 Médaille commémorative de la guerre 1914–1918
 Knight of the Order of Léopold (Belgium)
 Croix de guerre 1914-1918 (Belgium)
 Commander's Cross with Star of the Order of Polonia Restituta (16 July 1946, Poland)

References

External links
 Darius Paul Dassault (English)
 Darius Paul Dassault (French)
 Biographie de Paul-Darius BLOCH (DASSAULT)

1882 births
1969 deaths
Military personnel from Paris
French generals
French Army officers
Grand Croix of the Légion d'honneur
Commanders with Star of the Order of Polonia Restituta
Grand Chanceliers of the Légion d'honneur
Burials at Père Lachaise Cemetery
Dassault family